Lauf Cycling is an Icelandic bicycle brand based in Reykjavik, Iceland. They specialise in gravel bikes. 

The Lauf Forks idea was born over a cold bike-ride aprés beer in a cramped basement apartment in Reykjavik around Christmas-time 2010. Avid mountain biker and engineer Benedikt Skulason, at the time working as an R&D engineer for a high-end composite prosthetic feet company, pitched his idea of a super-light revolutionary bicycle suspension fork to his good friend and industrial designer Gudberg Bjornsson.

They are most commonly known for their invention of the Lauf Spring: a pivotless trailing link fork. A set of glass fiber springs are attached between the wheel set and the forks of a bike. Manufacturing is done in Iceland, with subsidiary dealers found in both Europe and the United States.

The company gained media attention, when Canadian Cyclocross National Champion, Michael Van Den Ham used Lauf bikes for his successful competition wins in 2018.

See also 
Bicycle suspension
Gravel bicycle
Glass Fiber

References

Cycle manufacturers
Cycling in Iceland
Manufacturing companies of Iceland
Companies based in Reykjavík